Scalp pruritus is an itchiness of the scalp, particularly common in elderly persons. Scalp pruritus is sometimes very unpleasant because itch and pain sensations share common nerve pathways.

See also
 Pruritus

References

 

Pruritic skin conditions
Scalp